Ramón Alberto Villaverde Vázquez (March 16, 1930 – September 15, 1986) was an Uruguayan footballer who played for FC Barcelona in Spain, among other clubs.

Honours

CF Barcelona
Spanish Champions: 2
1958/59, 1959/60
Copa del Generalísimo: 3
1956/57, 1958/59, 1962/63
Inter-Cities Fairs Cup: 2
1955/58, 1958/60
Small Club World Cup: 1
1957

Colombian League: 1953

Club statistics

External links
 Profile at historico.sportec.es
 

1930 births
1986 deaths
Uruguayan footballers
Uruguayan expatriate footballers
Uruguayan expatriate sportspeople in Spain
Liverpool F.C. (Montevideo) players
Categoría Primera A players
Cúcuta Deportivo footballers
Millonarios F.C. players
La Liga players
FC Barcelona players
Racing de Santander players
Expatriate footballers in Colombia
Expatriate footballers in Spain
Association football forwards